McCune may refer to:

McCune (surname)
 McCune, Kansas, small town in the U.S.
 McCune, Missouri, unincorporated community in the U.S.
 McCune Run, a tributary of French Creek, Pennsylvania

See also